The Meaning of Love is the debut studio album by Scottish singer Michelle McManus, issued by BMG. Released on 16 February 2004, it debuted at number three on the UK Albums Chart and featured two singles: the number one UK Singles Chart entry "All This Time", and the title track, which peaked at number sixteen. Critics derided the record for its production values and songwriting quality; multiple reviewers also found McManus's singing voice to be unimpressive. The album was deemed a commercial failure by Sony BMG, who dropped McManus from the label. The album has since received various "worst album" accolades.

The Meaning of Love was certified as gold by the British Phonographic Industry in April 2004, indicating sales of over 100,000 copies.

Reception and legacy

Lynsey Hanley in The Telegraph wrote: "This whole record smacks of boil-in-the-bag songwriting and lazy, hasty production tarted up with cheesy strings." She stated that McManus's singing "lack[s] any discernible 'wow' factor" and is on par with "a karaoke regular or, at best, a provincial cabaret turn." Guardian journalist Caroline Sullivan also saw McManus's vocals as lacking the "wow" factor, which, she said, "could have enlivened some of these sub-Celine Dion torchers." An entertainment.ie critic said that McManus, whose vocal performances "never rise far above the level of a very average club singer", made fellow reality television music competition winners Will Young and Alex Parks "look like worldbeaters by comparison."

McManus' native Scottish broadsheet press were not sympathetic. Leon McDermott of the Sunday Herald called the music "singularly unremarkable." He likened McManus to a "particularly adept ferry singer", while observing a lack of "emotion and anger, love and regret." In conclusion he said: "[S]he's competent, but sounds like a proficient karaoke singer rather than a bona fide pop star." Herald journalist Beth Pearson felt that the "tinny production and synths imported direct from the 1980s", made for a "thoroughly boring, unambitious debut." While The Scotsman'''s Fiona Shepherd delivered a track-by-track assessment of the record in which she criticised the quality of the material and described McManus as "another chicken-in-a-basket diva" with an "unremarkable" voice. Shepherd expressed a particular loathing for the cover version of Nina Simone's "Feelin' Good", which according to her, had "the guts ripped out of it." The track was derided by multiple reviewers.

Some reviewers, while unfavourable, were more receptive to McManus's vocals. Sharon Mawer in AllMusic saw the bulk of the material as "very bland, tuneless, and unmemorable", but commended McManus's "undoubted talent." She did, however, argue that McManus gained publicity more for "her outsized weight" than her singing. Daily Mirror critic Gavin Martin stressed that she "can actually sing", but observed "some of the most horrifying material ever", with songwriting that is "drowned in cliche, seemingly knocked off with barely a thought." BBC News writer Tom Bishop was impressed by McManus's "soulful" singing on Pop Idol, but felt her vocals sound "muffled and restrained by pedestrian production" on this "dull" album.

Deviating from critical consensus, BBC Music journalist Ruth Mitchell wrote that the album is "packed full of dreamy songs", and "surprisingly sounds like a very competent and unhurried effort indeed."The Meaning of Love won "Worst British Album" at the 2005 Naomi Awards. In a 2007 online poll, it was voted the seventh-worst album ever made by a Scottish artist.

Commercial performanceThe Meaning of Love debuted at number three on the UK Albums Chart on 22 February 2004. It shifted around 23,000 copies in its first week. It fell to number fourteen in its second week and lasted a further three weeks in the UK Top 40. The record performed well in Scotland, peaking at number one on the Scottish Albums Chart. However, across the UK, it was selling only one sixth of Pop Idol 2002 winner Will Young's debut From Now On. The album charted at number sixty four on the Irish Albums Chart. In the United Kingdom, The Meaning of Love'' received a gold certification, indicating sales of over 100,000 copies.

Charts

Track listing

References

2004 albums
Michelle McManus albums
19 Recordings albums
Albums produced by Steve Robson
Albums produced by Stephen Lipson
Albums produced by Mike Peden
Bertelsmann Music Group albums